William George Robert Sprague  (1863 – 4 December 1933) was a theatre architect.

Biography
He was born in Australia in 1863 the son of actress Dolores Drummond who returned with acclaim to London in 1874.

Sprague was an articled clerk for Frank Matcham for four years, then in 1880 was an articled clerk for Walter Emden for three years. He was in a partnership with Bertie Crewe until 1895. He went on to design a large number of theatres and music halls, almost all of them in London. At the height of his career he showed a productivity worthy of mentor Frank Matcham, producing six theatres in Westminster in less than four years. Unlike Matcham and Emden, Sprague studied architectural forms and conventions and used his knowledge in his designs, saying of himself that he "liked the Italian Renaissance" as a style for his frontages, but would take liberties when needed "to get the best effects" In 1902, the theatre newspaper The Era described him as "Britain’s youngest theatrical designer, with more London houses to his credit than any other man in the same profession."

In 1898, William Morton, owner and manager of the Greenwich Theatre, commissioned Sprague to produced plans for a 3,000-seat theatre to replace his existing theatre on a new site on London Street, but this was never followed through.

Sprague died in Maidenhead in 1933.

Theatres

References

External links
This is Theatre list of London Theatres, designers and opening dates

1863 births
1933 deaths
Australian emigrants to the United Kingdom
Theatre in the United Kingdom
Theatre architects
Architects from London